Frederick Gordon may refer to:

 Frederick Gordon (hotelier) (1835–1904), British hotel entrepreneur
 F. C. Gordon (Frederick Charles Gordon, 1856–1924), Canadian illustrator
 Frederick Stanley Gordon (1897–1985), World War I flying ace from New Zealand
 Frederick Gordon (British Army officer) (1861–1927)

See also
 Fred Gordon (1900–1985), ice hockey player